Elaphria versicolor (variegated midget) is a moth of the family Noctuidae. It is found in north-eastern North America, including Ontario and Ohio.

This wingspan is about 22 mm. The moth flies from May to July depending on the location.

The larvae feed on balsam fir, hemlock, pine, spruce, yellow birch and white cedar.

References

External links
Lepidoptera of Wayne County, Ohio

Caradrinini
Moths of North America
Moths described in 1875